Thomas Wroth may refer to:

 Thomas Wroth (died 1573) (1516–1573), English courtier and politician
 Thomas Wroth (died 1672) (1584–1672), English parliamentarian and author
Sir Thomas Wroth, 3rd Baronet (1674–1721), English High Sheriff and Member of Parliament

See also
Wroth (surname)